Jalyn Armour-Davis (born September 3, 1999) is an American football cornerback for the Baltimore Ravens of the National Football League (NFL). He played college football at Alabama.

Early life and high school
Armour-Davis grew up in Mobile, Alabama and attended St. Paul's Episcopal School. He was rated a four-star recruit and committed to play college football at Alabama.

College career
Armour-Davis suffered a season-ending knee injury during preseason training camp as a freshman and used a medical redshirt. He played in eight games during his redshirt freshman season. Armour-Davis played mostly on special teams as a redshirt sophomore. He was named a starter at cornerback going into his redshirt junior year and finished the season with 32 tackles, four passes broken up and three interceptions. Following the end of the season, Armour-Davis entered the 2022 NFL Draft.

Professional career

Armour-Davis was selected by the Baltimore Ravens in the fourth round, 119th overall, of the 2022 NFL Draft. He played in four games as a rookie before being placed on injured reserve on November 26, 2022 with a hip injury.

References

External links
 Baltimore Ravens bio
Alabama Crimson Tide bio

Living people
Players of American football from Alabama
Sportspeople from Mobile, Alabama
American football cornerbacks
Alabama Crimson Tide football players
Baltimore Ravens players
1999 births